Giuseppe Guarino (1885-1963) was an Italian film director, producer and screenwriter. He directed his first film La serata di gala di Titina in 1917 during the silent era. During the late 1920s he worked in the British film industry, but worked for most of his career on Italian films. He is sometimes credited as Guarino Glavany.

Selected filmography

Director
 Downstream (1929)
 An Obvious Situation (1930)
 The Accomplice (1932)
 Guest for One Night (1939)
 Tragic Serenade (1951)

Screenwriter
 The Inseparables (1929)
 I Want to Live with Letizia (1938)
 The Woman of Ice (1960)

References

Bibliography
 Low, Rachel. The History of British Film: Volume IV, 1918–1929. Routledge, 1997.

External links

1885 births
1963 deaths
Italian film directors
Italian film producers
Italian male screenwriters
Silent film screenwriters
People from Alexandria
20th-century Italian screenwriters
20th-century Italian male writers
Italian expatriates in Egypt